The Librarian: Curse of the Judas Chalice is a 2008 American made-for-television fantasy-adventure film and the third in The Librarian series starring Noah Wyle as a librarian who protects a secret collection of artifacts from Vlad Dracula and his vampire hordes. The television film was released on American cable channel TNT on December 7, 2008. It is a sequel to 2004's The Librarian: Quest for the Spear and 2006's The Librarian: Return to King Solomon's Mines.

Plot

Librarian Flynn Carsen (Noah Wyle) is in England bidding on a priceless Ming vase for the Library. He is simultaneously on the phone with Charlene (Jane Curtin) and with his girlfriend, Katie (Beth Burvant), who is at the end of her rope. Frantic and distracted, he bids £1 million and loses Katie. He signs for the vase and promptly breaks it, revealing the philosopher's stone, which changes anything it touches into gold. Flynn deftly defends the stone and races to meet Katie: She has flown home.

Meanwhile, in Carpathia, a group of former KGB agents led by Sergei Kubichek (Dikran Tulaine) plot to bring back the defunct Soviet Union by resurrecting the famous vampire, Prince Vlad Dracula, using the "Judas Chalice.” In  Bucharest, they kidnap Professor Lazlo (Bruce Davison), a genius historian with a penchant for vampire lore who has searched for the chalice for years. The elderly, disabled professor joins them unwillingly and directs them to New Orleans.

In the Library, Charlene chastises Flynn for going over budget. Combined with the loss of Katie, this is the last straw: He has a full-blown meltdown. Judson (Bob Newhart), Charlene (Jane Curtin), and the sword Excalibur (his best friend) suggest that Flynn take a vacation. Charlene wonders if he'll come back, and Judson replies that the Library has plans for him.

Charlene drops by Flynn's apartment after her combination-speed-dating-and-wine-tasting to give him some travel brochures and advice: “Follow your dreams.”. That night, Flynn's strange dreams point him to New Orleans. There, he meets Andrew ( pronounced André) (Werner Richmond), a guide. In a church-turned-nightclub, he encounters singer Simone Renoir (Stana Katic), the woman in his dreams. She guards the first marker for locating the Judas Chalice. After narrowly escaping Kubichek's men, Flynn and Simone do the town and spend the night together.

In the morning, Flynn has a magical encounter with Judson, who explains that the Judas Chalice is the vampire version of the Holy Grail, formed from the 30 pieces of silver given to Judas Iscariot after he betrayed Jesus Christ. Judson tells Flynn to intercept the chalice and gives him crucial information about staking vampires: The stake must be of aspen wood because Judas, the first vampire,  hanged himself on an aspen.

Flynn deciphers the clues on the first marker. Andrew takes him to the tomb of Marie Laveau, the "voodoo queen" of New Orleans, where he discovers the second marker, only to be grabbed by Kubichek's men. Kubichek introduces Professor Lazlo. They poison Flynn with a hallucinogen so that they can stage an accident. Before it kicks in, Flynn escapes his bonds. He and  Professor Lazlo, working in nearly perfect synchrony, decipher its clues.  It is a lens with a map inscribed on it. The professor tells Flynn to run. He flees through a Carnival-style street party until Kubichek's men corner him. Simone attacks the henchmen, turning into mist and exerting inhuman strength until one blasts her in the chest with a shotgun. Flynn causes a gas fire, giving him time to carry Simone's dead body outside. Flynn grieves—until she rises.

He passes out and wakes in Simone's home. She is a vampire, born in Paris, France in 1603, and turned at age 25. She had been a promising opera singer, deeply in love with a university teacher (played by Noah Wyle), until a chance encounter with a vampire changed her. She wants to destroy her maker so she can die in peace. When she learned of the Judas Chalice, she vowed to protect it and aid the monks who hid it in New Orleans. She has done so for two hundred years. Simone shows Flynn a 1,000-year-old painting that represents the fight of the Library against Evil. It shows the Scholar, the first Librarian, builder of the Library. The Knight/Scholar's shield is blazoned with the Tree of Knowledge. His name is Yahuda, “Hebrew for Judson,” Flynn murmurs.

Andrew takes them into the bayou to the wrecked pirate ship and last resting place of Jean Lafitte—and the chalice. They are again overtaken by Kubichek and his men, with Lazlo in tow. They leave Flynn and Simone trapped on board. Simone is too weak to break free because she has not fed. Flynn uses a ship's cannon to blast down one of the doors. Once free, Simone steals Andre's boat, abandoning Flynn for his own good. Hurt but determined, he makes his way back to the mainland and finds Kubichek's hideout.

Simone arrives at the same time, and they are captured. Kubichek performs the ceremony on Vlad Dracula's body amidst gusting wind and thunder—with no result. Laughing, Professor Lazlo drinks from the chalice and is transformed. He is Vlad Dracula, the vampire who turned Simone. His handicap was not a lie. He was infected during a cholera outbreak. He has been feeding on  Kubichek's henchmen, turning them into a new army of vampires.

Kubichek and his remaining henchmen, Flynn, and Simone battle the vampires. Flynn follows Vlad outside to retrieve the chalice. Kubichek sends Simone after them and blows up the hideout with a grenade. Flynn literally runs into an aspen tree and tricks the overconfident Lazlo into coming close enough to be staked. He dies in a pillar of fire. At peace, Simone asks Flynn to help her watch one last sunrise. They kiss goodbye, and she gently dissolves in a drift of sparkles.

Flynn remembers Simone's words about living with purpose and passion and returns to the Library to resume his duties. He gives Charlene the first marker on a cord. He starts to read the inscription but instead tells her that it says "follow your dreams"—her advice to him. Where did your dream take you? she asks. Home, he replies.

Judson will not admit to Flynn that he is the scholar/knight in Simone's painting, Yahuda. (In season 4 of The Librarians, it is clearly stated that Judson is indeed the founder of the Library.) Flynn accepts his destiny as part of the fight between good and evil without regrets. The camera pulls up to show the shape of the Tree of Knowledge seen in Simone's painting, built into the Library.

Cast
 Noah Wyle as Flynn Carsen
 Bruce Davison as Professor Lazlo / Vlad
 Stana Katic as Simone Renoir
 Bob Newhart as Judson
 Jane Curtin as Charlene
 Dikran Tulaine as Sergei Kubichek
 Jason Douglas as Ivan
 Beth Burvant as Katie
 Werner Richmond as Andrew
 Stephen David Calhoun as Nicolai

Reception

Ratings
The film averaged 5.44 million viewers over its two-hour run.

Critical response
Andrew L. Urban of Urban Cinefile gave it a positive review and wrote: "As soon as the opening credits begin, spurred on by Joseph LoDuca's 'adventure' score, we know we're in Indiana Jones territory but Indy has left the building, and the filmmakers have their tongues firmly in their cheeks."

Awards

Nominated for three 2009 Emmy Awards, including Outstanding Supporting Actor In A Miniseries Or A Movie (Bob Newhart).

Production notes

Writer Marco Schnabel said that he does not think that bringing vampires into the story gave the film a different tone from the first two, noting that the horror elements were not too dark and that supernatural elements had always been a part of the franchise.

References

External links

 
 
 

2008 television films
2008 films
Curse of the Judas Chalice
Television sequel films
Treasure hunt films
Films shot in New Orleans
Films directed by Jonathan Frakes
Dracula films
Adventure television films
Cultural depictions of Jean Lafitte